Elections to Amber Valley Borough Council in Derbyshire, England were held on 1 May 2008.  One third of the council was up for election and the Conservative Party held overall control of the council.

The election saw the British National Party gain two seats from the Labour Party in Heanor West and Heanor East and come within one vote in Heanor and Loscoe ward. 

After the election, the composition of the council was:
Conservative 29
Labour 14
British National Party 2

Election result

Ward results

References

2008 Amber Valley election result
Election Results
Election results

2008 English local elections
2008
2000s in Derbyshire